Stogdon is a surname. Notable people with the surname include:

 Edgar Stogdon (1870–1951), English academic, cleric, and athlete
 Jean Stogdon (1928–2014), British social worker and campaigner
 John Stogdon (1876–1944), English cricketer